Ilmari Keinänen (5 November 1887, in Kuopio – 8 November 1934) was a Finnish gymnast who competed in the 1912 Summer Olympics. He was part of the Finnish team, which won the silver medal in the gymnastics men's team, free system event.

References

External links
profile

1887 births
1934 deaths
People from Kuopio
People from Kuopio Province (Grand Duchy of Finland)
Finnish male artistic gymnasts
Gymnasts at the 1912 Summer Olympics
Olympic gymnasts of Finland
Olympic silver medalists for Finland
Olympic medalists in gymnastics
Medalists at the 1912 Summer Olympics
Sportspeople from North Savo
20th-century Finnish people